Vatan ve Hürriyet ("Motherland and Liberty" in Turkish) was a small, secret revolutionary society of reformist officers opposed to the autocratic regime of Ottoman sultan Abdul Hamid II in the early 20th century. It was started by Mustafa Cantekin while in exile in Syria. The future founder of the Republic of Turkey, Mustafa Kemal Atatürk, joined the group in 1905 as a young lieutenant in the Ottoman army in Damascus.

References

Mustafa Kemal Atatürk
Paramilitary organizations based in Turkey